Holy Field is an informal designation for the initiative taken by the parish of four churches located in Moscow region near the Holy Trinity Monastery. The initiative aims at spreading the Gospel, restoring the shrines, supporting the indigent.

Name and mission
The initiative's designation derives from the name of the village Buzhaninovo as the St.Nicholas church located there was the first one restored from the four others in parish. While "Buzhaninovo" originally derives from the family name of the village's ancient master – Ivan Buzhenina, the deeper look into the name's folk etymology has unveiled its consonance with 'bozh-ya 'ni-va – a "holy field" in Russian. Eventually the whole parish of four nearby churches has been labeled the “Holy Field”, reflecting the common essence of their mission along with an evident attribution to the Gospel.

Gospel spreading
The parish voluntary distributes the New Testament, Bible, Psalms, prayer books and the other related literature among the congregation and the church's visitors. The Saturday night and Sunday (liturgy) services are weekly held at the St. Nicholas church. The services in three other churches are mostly held on the major feasts. Every service includes the sermon and the Gospel reading. The Sunday school and the library are open at the St. Nicholas church rectory.

Shrines restoration
The parish, the local deanery and the individual donors are sponsoring the restoration and the improvement of the four temples and their territories. At present the services in St. Nicholas and the Protection churches are held even in the winter time.

Charity
The parish supports the local orphanages and provides the feeding and clothing distribution for the indigent. The rectory of the St. Nicholas church accommodates the parish assemblies, lectures and meals.

References

External links 
  Holy Field.ru
  Protection Church website

Russian Orthodox church buildings
Churches in Moscow Oblast
Christian charities
Charities based in Russia